Praeichneumon is an extinct genus of ichneumon wasps from the Lower Cretaceous of Mongolia and the Russian region of Transbaikalia. It was originally described by Alexandr Pavlovich Rasnitsyn in 1983, who also added a second species in 1990. Three new species were described by D. S. Kopylov in 2012.

References

Ichneumonoidea genera
Prehistoric Hymenoptera genera
Cretaceous insects
Fossils of Mongolia
Fossils of Russia